First Baptist Church was a historic Southern Baptist church located at 401 S. Scales Street in Reidsville, Rockingham County, North Carolina.  It was built in 1918, and was a Late Gothic Revival style brick church. It has a three bay wide front facade with crenellated towers of unequal height and a three-part tracery stained glass window.  It was home to an African-American Baptist congregation until the mid-1970s.

It was added to the National Register of Historic Places in 1986. It has since been demolished.

References

African-American history of North Carolina
Baptist churches in North Carolina
Churches on the National Register of Historic Places in North Carolina
Gothic Revival church buildings in North Carolina
Churches completed in 1918
Churches in Rockingham County, North Carolina
National Register of Historic Places in Rockingham County, North Carolina
Southern Baptist Convention churches